Alexandra Dock may refer to:

Queen Alexandra Dock, Cardiff
Alexandra Dock at Newport, South Wales, operated by the Alexandra (Newport and South Wales) Docks and Railway
Alexandra Dock, Liverpool
Alexandra Dock railway station (LNWR)
Alexandra Dock railway station (Liverpool Overhead Railway) in Liverpool
Alexandra Dock branch, which served Bootle Balliol Road and Alexandra Dock (LNWR)
Alexandra Dock, Grimsby
Alexandra Dock, Hull